Chick flick is a slang term, sometimes used pejoratively, for the film genre catered specifically to women's interests, and is marketed toward women demographics. They generally tend to appeal more to a younger female audience and deal mainly with love and romance. Although many types of films may be directed toward a female audience, the term "chick flick" is typically used only in reference to films that contain personal drama and emotion or themes that are relationship-based (although not necessarily romantic, as films may focus on parent-child or friend relationships). Chick flicks often are released en masse around Valentine's Day. Feminists such as Gloria Steinem have objected to terms such as "chick flick" and the related genre term "chick lit", and a film critic has called it derogatory.

Definitions 
Generally, a chick flick is a film designed to have an innate appeal to women, typically young women. Defining a chick flick is, as The New York Times has stated, more of a parlor game than a science. These films are generally held in popular culture as having formulaic, paint-by-numbers plot lines and characters. This makes usage of the term "problematic" for implying "frivolity, artlessness, and utter commercialism", according to ReelzChannel. However, several chick flicks have received high critical acclaim for their stories and performances. For example, the 1983 film Terms of Endearment received Academy Awards for Best Screenplay, Best Picture, Best Director, Best Actress, and Best Actor in a Supporting Role. More recently, the film La La Land (called a chick flick in some circles), featuring both Emma Stone and Ryan Gosling, won Best Actress at the Academy Awards. Both of these actors were well known for their roles in chick flicks before jumping to the academy level.

Some frequent elements of chick flicks include having a female protagonist, thematic use of the color pink (along with metaphorical allusions of the color), and romance and/or dating-based storylines. Longtime producer Jerry Bruckheimer has remarked about the plots, "How do you cope with money and love?"

Women are typically portrayed in chick flicks as sassy, noble victims, or klutzy twentysomethings.  Romantic comedies (rom-coms) are often also chick flicks.  However, rom-coms are typically respected more than chick flicks because they are designed to appeal to men and women.

Female MSN.com commentator Kim Morgan has written:

History 
The term "chick flick" was not widely used until the 1980s and 1990s. It has its roots in the "women's pictures" of the early twentieth century, which portrays the woman as a victim and housewife, and later the film noir of the 1940s and early 1950s, which portrays the threat of sexualized women. In the 1950s, many women who were in the workforce during World War II faced the transition back into the home. Brandon French notes that the women's films of the 1950s "shed light on a different cluster of issues and situations women faced in their transition from the forties to the sixties: romance, courtship, work, marriage, sex, motherhood, divorce, loneliness, adultery, alcoholism, widowhood, heroism, madness, and ambition."

The 1961 film Breakfast at Tiffany's, commonly known as one of the "classic" films from the golden age of cinema, is sometimes considered an early chick flick due to common elements such as dealing with loneliness, obsessive materialism, and happy endings. Author Molly Haskell has suggested that chick flicks are very different from the women's films of the 1940s and 1950s in that they now "sing a different tune." She feels that they are "more defiant and upbeat, post-modern and post-feminist."

In the U.S. in the 1980s, a succession of teenage drama pictures also labeled as chick flicks were released, many by director John Hughes. These often had a different and more realistic tone than previous chick flicks, with dramatic elements such as abortion and personal alienation being included.

Several chick flicks have been patterned after the story of Cinderella and other fairy tales (e.g. A Cinderella Story, Ever After, and Pretty Woman), or even Shakespeare in the case of She's the Man and 10 Things I Hate About You. In addition, a large number are adapted from popular novels (e.g. The Princess Diaries and The Devil Wears Prada) and literary classics (e.g. Little Women). While most films that are considered chick flicks are lighthearted, some suspense films also fall under this category, such as What Lies Beneath.

After the blockbuster success of the 2008 drama/romance film Twilight, Paul Dergarabedian of Media By Numbers remarked, "[t]he word 'chick flick' is going to have to be replaced by big box-office girl-power flick" and that "[t]he box-office clout of the female audience is just astounding, and it's been an underserved audience for way too long". He also said, "they have no trouble finding money for the things they're passionate about." According to Fandango.com, more than 75% of Twilight opening-weekend audience was female.

Criticism of the term 
The term chick flick has generated several negative responses from the modern feminist community. Most criticisms of the genre concentrate on the negative consequences that arise from gendering certain interests, in this case film. Author of The Chick Flick Paradox: Derogatory? Feminist? or Both?, Natalia Thompson, states that chick flicks are "an attempt to lump together an entire gender's interests into one genre."

While the tailoring of interests may seem helpful and natural, many critics argue that unnecessary gendering can have negative consequences on many different social groups. There is evidence from Russian social scientist Natal'ia Rimashevskaia that gender stereotypes further perpetuated by the media can lead to discrimination against women and limit their "human and intellectual potential."

More criticisms of the term arise from actual content of the films in the chick flick genre and how the content affects society's perception of women. Some say that chick flicks are micro-aggressions. Micro-aggressions are actions or exchanges that degrade a person based on his or her membership in a "race, gender, age, and ability."

Critique of the genre 
Despite the genre's popular successes, some film critics take issue with the content most chick flicks have in common. Although the subcategories represent different plot lines, all five have several characteristics in common. Many chick flicks can have the "ironic, self-deprecating tone" which film theorist Hilary Radner associates with chick lit.
This tone is one of the defining characteristics of the genre, and many feel that it lacks substance compared to other genres. Radner also goes on to say the genre is "incredibly heteronormative and white-washed." These common characteristics of the genre can lead to criticism from minority groups and social-justice activists. More issues with the genre emerge from the opinion that chick flicks play to every woman's "patriarchal unconscious".

In her article Structural Integrity, Historical Reversion, and the Post-9/11 Chick Flick, Diane Negra focuses on several romantic comedies, deemed to be chick flicks, set in New York City after the attacks on September 11, 2001. She claims that the films "centralize female subjectivity but more compellingly undertake political work to stabilize national identity post-9/11." Political and social upheaval following the attacks led to a need for films that show the importance of protecting gender and family norms, or "ideological boundaries", as opposed to the emphasis on "survivalism" and "homeland security" used to protect national boundaries, seen in the action films at the time. Juxtaposed with the "politically innocent" genre of the pre-9/11 period, the films are rife with political undertones that are meant "to stabilize national identity post-9/11".

While most chick flicks center around a romantic conquest, Alison Winch ("We Can Have It All") writes about films she calls "girlfriend flicks". These movies emphasize the relationships between friends instead of focusing on a love connection; examples include Bride Wars and Baby Mama.

According to Winch, 

Winch also states that girlfriend flicks criticize "second wave feminism's superficial understanding of female solidarity" by showing "conflict, pain, and betrayal acted out between women". By emphasizing the "complexities of women's relationships",  the girlfriend flick breaks the mold for the usual chick flick and allows the genre to gain a bit of depth.

Examples 
The following films have been characterized as chick flicks by some commentators:
{{columns-list|colwidth=25em|
 Love Story (1970)
 The Way We Were (1973)
 Grease (1978)
 An Officer and a Gentleman (1982)
 Valley Girl (1983)
 Terms of Endearment (1983)
 Sixteen Candles (1984)
 Dirty Dancing (1987)
 Beaches (1988)
 Steel Magnolias (1989)
 When Harry Met Sally... (1989)
 Pretty Woman (1990)
 Ghost (1990)
 The Bodyguard (1992)
 Sleepless in Seattle (1993)
 Mad Love (1995)
 Waiting to Exhale (1995)
 Clueless (1995)
 The First Wives Club (1996)
 My Best Friend's Wedding (1997)
 Titanic (1997)
 There's Something About Mary (1998)
 How Stella Got Her Groove Back (1998)
 One True Thing (1998)
 Practical Magic (1998)
 You've Got Mail (1998)
 10 Things I Hate about You (1999)
 The Story of Us (1999)
 Where the Heart Is (2000)
 Bridget Jones's Diary (2001)
 Legally Blonde (2001)
 The Princess Diaries (2001)
 Blue Crush (2002)
 How to Lose a Guy in 10 Days (2003)
 Mean Girls (2004)
 The Notebook (2004)
 A Cinderella Story (2004)
 The Sisterhood of the Traveling Pants (2005)
 Aquamarine (2006)
 The Devil Wears Prada (2006)
 The Lake House (2006)
 Hairspray (2007)
 Enchanted (2007)
 27 Dresses (2008)
 Sex and the City (2008)
 Twilight (2008)
 The Proposal (2009)
 Confessions of a Shopaholic (2009)
 Bridesmaids (2011)
 Fifty Shades of Grey (2015)
 Tall Girl (2019)
}}

See also

 Chick lit
 Feminist film theory
 Female buddy film
 "Love means never having to say you're sorry"
 Women in film
 Women's cinema
 Woman's film
 October 3

References
Notes

Bibliography
 
 Cook, Samantha. The Rough Guide to Chick-Flicks'', Rough Guides Ltd, 2006.
 Erens, Patricia. Issues In Feminist Film Criticism. Bloomington : Indiana University Press,  1990. Print.
 Ferriss, Suzanne, and Mallory Young. Chick Flicks: Contemporary Women at the Movies. New York: Routledge, 2008. Print.
 French, Brandon. On the Verge of Revolt: Women in American Films of the Fifties. New York: Frederick Ungar Publishing Co., 1978. Print.
 Kaplan, E. Ann. Women and Film: Both Sides of the Camera. New York: Methuen, 1983. Print.
 McIntosh, Heather. "Representation of Women." Encyclopedia of Women in Today's World. Ed. Mary Zeiss Stange, Carol K. Oyster, and Jane E. Sloan. 1st ed. Thousand Oaks, CA: SAGE Publications, Inc., 2011. 1222–26. SAGE knowledge. Web. December 9, 2015.
 Nance, Nicoletta C. "Implicit Bias." Encyclopedia of Human Services and Diversity. Ed. Linwood H. Cousins. Vol. 5 Thousand Oaks, CA: SAGE Publications, Inc., 2014. 695–97. SAGE knowledge. Web. December 9, 2015.
 
 Radner, Hilary. Neo-Feminist Cinema : Girly Films, Chick Flicks And Consumer Culture. New York: Routledge, 2011. Print.
 
 
 

Film genres
Depictions of women in film
Women's entertainment